Miraz (Dowry) is the ninth studio album by Bosnian pop-folk singer Elvira Rahić. It was released 14 February 2008 through Hayat Production.

Title
When asked why the album was called Miraz (Dowry), she replied "There's nothing autobiographical. Dowry is the dream of every girl and pride of all parents. We are only trying to bring something new to the scene."

Track listing

Personnel

Instruments

Muhamed Šehić Hamić – keyboards, accordion
Mustafa Behmen – bouzouki
M. Asotić – guitar
Emir Hot – guitar
Samir Mujagić – guitar (8)
Ado Busuladžić – saxophone, clarinet

Production and recording
Muhamed Šehić Hamić – arrangement (1, 2, 3, 4, 5, 6, 7, 9, 10, 11, 12), mastering, mixing, programming
J. Draganović – programming

References

External links
Miraz at Discogs
Miraz at iTunes
Miraz at Amazon UK

2008 albums
Elvira Rahić albums
Hayat Production albums